Zoran Zukić (born 6 June 1981) is a Serbian football forward.

References

External links
 
 

1981 births
Living people
Footballers from Novi Sad
Association football forwards
Serbian footballers
FK Mladost Lučani players
FK ČSK Čelarevo players
FK Dinamo Vranje players
FK Metalac Gornji Milanovac players
FK Proleter Novi Sad players
Serbian SuperLiga players